Pittsburg is an unincorporated community in Johnson County, Arkansas, United States. It is located at a latitude of 35.4375 and a longitude of -93.36944 and was named after the industrial heritage of Pittsburgh, Pennsylvania.

External links
Pittsburg, Arkansas description at PlaceNames.com

Unincorporated communities in Johnson County, Arkansas